Nong Khang Phlu is a khwaeng (subdistrict) of Nong Khaem District, in Bangkok, Thailand. In 2020, it had a total population of 75,725 people.

References

Subdistricts of Bangkok